General elections were held in the British Virgin Islands on 1 September 1975.  The result was one of the most confused in the Territory's history, but is officially recorded as a victory for the United Party led by Willard Wheatley over the opposition Virgin Islands Party (VIP) led by former Chief Minister Lavity Stoutt.  

In reality the election provided no clear consensus, and when the election was over, successful candidates dropped their prior allegiances and tried to broker deals that would enable them to secure power. At the end of this process Willard Wheatley retained his role as Chief Minister and led a coalition loosely affiliated to the United Party. But as has been recorded: "The 1975 General Elections did not produce a clear majority for any party and the loyalties, which appeared to have existed prior to and in the course of the election campaign, fell apart in the aftermath.  Mr. W.W. Wheatly again emerged as Chief Minister, but with a different team."

Background
The 1975 general election was something of a dangerous crossroad for British Virgin Islands politics.  The first party political election in 1967 had been won by the United Party.  However, internal struggles relating to who should be leader led to the party fragmenting before the next election.  That allowed the opposition VI Democratic Party to win the 1971 election, but exactly the same thing happened to them: disagreements between party leader Q.W. Osborne and Chief Minister Willard Wheatley led Wheatley to remove Osborne from his Ministerial seat.  The resulting discord meant that, despite technically being the party in power, the VI Democratic Party did not actually promote any candidates at all for the 1975 election - Wheatley left to form an alliance with the United Party, and Osborne left to join the Virgin Islands Party.

Results
Willard Wheatley won the election in a coalition with the United Party. Although the United Party only won two seats, fewer than the Virgin Islands Party (which won three), Wheatley was able to assemble a coalition and remain Chief Minister and at the head of government.

Austin Henley was a former member of the VI Democratic Party, but ran as a United Party candidate. However, after the election he was named Leader of the Opposition. Henley later died in office, and Oliver Cills continued as Leader of the Opposition.  Both Henley and Cills were recorded as members of the VI Democratic Party whilst Leaders of the Opposition.

Candidates elected for the first time included future Chief Minister and Premier, Ralph T. O'Neal.

By constituency

Footnotes

Elections in the British Virgin Islands
British Virgin
General election
British Virgin
1975 elections in the British Empire